Johnson County Transit is a public transit operator in Johnson County, Kansas. It is the operator of 13 Local Bus routes in Douglas, Johnson, Miami, and Wyandotte Counties in Kansas and Jackson County in Missouri.

The JO, as it is generally called, started operations in 1982 as Commuteride and began operating as The JO in 1986.  The JO took over service from the Kansas City Area Transportation Authority, which provided service in Johnson County until 1981.

Since November of 2014, The JO has been re-branded into "RideKC" – a branding effort designed to unify all Kansas City metro area transit providers under a single fare and route structure.

Regular Routes 
Johnson County Transit is now using route numbers integrated with those used by the KC Metro bus system.  The new numeric designations, mostly formed by placing a 3-digit number before the letter designation, are shown.

546: KCK-Johnson Drive-Quivira
556: Metcalf-Plaza
575: 75th Street/Quivira
660: Antioch-Downtown
661: Olathe Xpress
664: Metcalf-Downtown
667: Nall-Downtown
670: South Johnson County Xpress
672: Midday
673: 151st-Downtown Xpress
678: Shawnee-Downtown Xpress
710: K-10 Connector
812: Jo Flex
856: Metcalf/Plaza Flex
875: 75th Street/Quivira Flex

Other Services 
In addition to The JO, Johnson County Transit also operates three other services; Local Links, The JO-Special Edition, & SWIFT.

Local Links 
Local Links are either deviated-fixed routes or demand-response routes, with designated, geographic service areas.  Many of the Local Links are a partnership between Johnson County Transit, the city or cities being served.  The Local Links routes are:

812 JOFlex – A deviated-fixed route operating Tuesday & Friday, mostly in north-central Overland Park, Kansas.  The fare is $1.00 per trip.

The JO-Special Edition 
The JO-Special Edition, a shared ride program administered by Johnson County Transit, provides affordable curb-to-curb transportation for residents of Johnson County who are sixty (60) years of age or older, or have a documented disability or are within established
low-income guidelines.

Eligible riders may use The JO-Special Edition for any trip purpose within the Johnson County service area.  Children ages 13 to 18 with a documented disability may ride for medical appointments only.  The JO – Special Edition travels into specified areas of
Kansas City, Kansas and Kansas City, Missouri for medical trips only.

Special Edition operates curb-to-curb service Monday-Friday and is provided on a first come, first served basis.  Fares are based upon distance traveled and multiple ride passes are available.

SWIFT 
SWIFT (Sheltered Workshop Industrial Fixed Transit) provides Monday-Friday, curb-to-curb transportation for developmentally disabled individuals working at the Johnson County Developmental Supports facility in Lenexa, Kansas.

Partner Agencies 
Kansas City Area Transportation Authority
Lawrence Transit-The T official site
KU on Wheels official site
KU Parking & Transit official site
The Bus official site
Mid-America Regional Council official site

References

External links 
Ride KC Regional Call Center (Johnson County Transit official site decommissioned as of December 2015)

Public transportation in Kansas City, Missouri
Transportation in Johnson County, Kansas
Bus transportation in Kansas
Transit agencies in Kansas